Siag Office is a tightly integrated free software office package for Unix-like operating systems. It consists of the spreadsheet SIAG ("Scheme In A Grid"), the word processor Pathetic Writer (PW), the animation program Egon Animator, the text editor XedPlus, the file manager Xfiler and the previewer Gvu.

Siag Office is known to be extremely light-weight, hence able to run on very old systems reasonably well, such as on i486 computers with 16MB RAM. Because it is kept light-weight, the software lacks many of the features of major office suites, like LibreOffice, Calligra Suite, or Microsoft Office.  Siag Office is distributed under the terms of the GPL-2.0-or-later license.

Version 3.6.0 was released in 2003, and the latest version 3.6.1 was released in 2006.

Siag Office is included in Damn Small Linux, a lightweight Linux distribution.

Components

Siag
Siag is the spreadsheet based on the X Window System and the Scheme programming language (specifically using home-grown variant SIOD ("Scheme in One Defun")). The program has existed in several incarnations: text-based curses for SunOS, text-based hardcoded VT52 for Atari TOS, GEM-based for Atari, Turbo C for DOS, Xlib-based for Linux and now Xt-based for POSIX-compliant systems.

It supports import of CSV, Lotus 1-2-3 (.wk1), Scheme Code (.scm), ABScript (.abs), Siag (.siag) native format and partially also XLS files (very limited support) and OpenOffice.org XML (.sxc). It can export files to CSV, TXT, Postscript (.ps), HTML, Lotus 1-2-3 (.wk1), Troff table (.tbl), Latex table (.tex), PDF and its native Siag format.

PW
PW (Pathetic Writer) is an X-based word processor for Unix. Support for RTF (Rich Text Format) allows documents to be exchanged between Pathetic Writer and legacy Windows applications. External converters such as Caolan McNamara's wv can be used to read virtually any format, including Microsoft Word. HTML pages can be loaded and saved, making it possible to instantly publish PW documents on the web.

Egon Animator
Egon Animator is the X-based animation development tool for Unix. The idea is that "objects" (rectangles, lines, pixmaps and so on) are added to a "stage" where they are then made to perform by telling them where they should be and when. It can also edit MagicPoint files.

See also

 Comparison of office suites

References

Review 
 Siag Office is far from pathetic, Linux.com, 2007

External links

Open-source office suites
Free 2D animation software

Office suites